This is a list of notable events relating to the environment in 1995. They relate to environmental law, conservation, environmentalism and environmental issues.

Events
The Alpine Convention, an international territorial treaty for the sustainable development of the Alps, entered into force.
Greenpeace opposed the sinking of the Brent Spar oil rig in the North Sea.
The Environment Act 1995 is passed in the United Kingdom, creating a number of new agencies and setting new standards for environmental management.

February
February 16—The government of Bangladesh enacted the Bangladesh Environment Conservation Act.

November
Nigerian environmental activist Ken Saro-Wiwa, along with eight others from the Movement for the Survival of the Ogoni People, are hanged by government forces.
The Threatened Species Protection Act 1995 is passed by the Parliament of Tasmania.

See also

Human impact on the environment
List of environmental issues

References

 
1995